Moodalmanju is a 1970 Indian Malayalam film,  directed by Sudin Menon and produced by C Vasudevan Nair. The film stars Prem Nazir, Sheela, Adoor Bhasi and P. J. Antony in the lead roles. The film had musical score by Usha Khanna.

Cast

Prem Nazir as Rajesh/Raju
Sheela as Geetha, Usha
Adoor Bhasi as Lonappan
P. J. Antony
Vincent as Prasad
T. R. Omana as Madhaviyamma
G. K. Pillai as Chandrasekharan Nair
Jyothi
Kaduvakulam Antony as Sankaran Nair
Kumari Thankam
Madhubala as Syamala
P. R. Menon
Sreekumar
 Narayanan

Soundtrack

References

External links
 

1970 films
1970s Malayalam-language films
Films scored by Usha Khanna